The Thomas A. Greene Memorial Museum, also known as Greene Geological Museum or Greene Museum, is a mineral and fossil museum in Milwaukee, Wisconsin administered by the Department of Geosciences at the University of Wisconsin–Milwaukee.

Original building
The original fireproof museum building, designed by noted Milwaukee architect, Alexander Eschweiler, held the collection of Thomas A. Greene, Milwaukee druggist and amateur geologist, plant collector, and fossil collector. In 1913, Greene's heirs, Mrs. H.A.J. Upham and Mr. Howard Greene, had the facility built to house his collection, and it was declared a National Historic Landmark in 1993, in recognition of the collection's significance as a largely intact amateur geological collection. The collection has been removed from the building, and is now displayed and housed in Lapham Hall on the UWM campus.

The building has been renovated and is currently used as academic space for UWM's Sam and Helen Stahl Center for Jewish Studies.

Collection
Greene amassed most of the fossils in his collection, totaling about 75,000 specimens, during the 1880s and 1890s.  The majority of these specimens come from the Silurian Racine Dolomite Formation and the Devonian Milwaukee Formation in the vicinity of southeastern Wisconsin.  Preserved mostly as internal molds in dolomite, these fossils include a wide range of Silurian marine invertebrate groups including trilobites, crinoids, tabulate and rugose corals, brachiopods, cephalopods, and gastropods.  Devonian fossils consist mainly of fish and plant remains.  All of these fossils were collected from quarry outcrops that no longer exist, making the collection irreplaceable.

The mineral collection contains a wide range of minerals and ores from localities throughout North America, as well as some from overseas.  It includes exquisite examples of amethyst, apatite, stibnite, copper, tungsten, molybdenum, vanadium, cobalt, nickel, mercury compounds, aluminum compounds, malachite, lapis-lazuli, tourmaline, garnet, labradorite, fluorite, beryl, and turquoise, among others. Perhaps the highlight of the mineral collection is a piece of iron meteorite that landed in nearby Washington County, Wisconsin.  It was given to Greene by the scientist Increase A. Lapham, the namesake of Lapham Hall.

Greene collaborated with another amateur, Dr. Fisk Holbrook Day, whose home in Wauwatosa, Wisconsin, the Dr. Fisk Holbrook Day House, has also been designated a National Historic Landmark.

See also
List of National Historic Landmarks in Wisconsin
National Register of Historic Places listings in Milwaukee

References

External links
Thomas A. Greene Memorial Museum
Greene Gallery virtual tour

Museums established in 1913
University and college buildings on the National Register of Historic Places in Wisconsin
Geology museums in the United States
Museums in Milwaukee
National Historic Landmarks in Wisconsin
Natural history museums in Wisconsin
University museums in Wisconsin
Paleontology in Wisconsin
1913 establishments in Wisconsin
National Register of Historic Places in Milwaukee
Museums on the National Register of Historic Places